Szymon Roginski (born 1975 in Gdańsk) is a Polish photographer.

Biography

His artistic education started with the actor’s studies  at School on Wheels Derevo Theater, Germany/Netherlands (1997-1998). After graduating Artistic Photography Study in Gdańsk (1999-2000) Roginski started his professional career at Department of Photography at National Museum in Gdańsk (1999-2000) and at Gazeta Wyborcza photographic studio (2000-2004).
He was twice (2010 and 2013) granted a scholarship of the Minister of Culture, and he teaches at Academy of Photography, in Warsaw (2012-2013). 

He took part in several group shows in reputed art institutions in Poland and abroad, at Museum of Modern and Contemporary Art of Trento and Rovereto (MART) Italy (2014); BOZAR, Brussels (2012); CCA Ujazdowski Castle, Warsaw (2008) and had a solo exhibition, the last one at Aleksander Bruno Gallery, Warsaw (2014). Roginski made a name for himself with his UFO project, a series of staged shots developed from 2005-07 which used artificial lighting to conjure up night scenes of extraterrestrial landings. 

In years 2003-2006, Roginski conceived the ‘’Poland Synthesis’’ series, a nocturnal portrait of the Polish province. The one of his last project is ‘’Black’’, that explores the photography as a medium and examines the borderline between photography and abstract painting.

Selected group exhibitions
Perduti nel paesaggio/Lost in Landscape, Museum of Modern and Contemporary Art of Trento and Rovereto (MART) (2014)
Home Made. Construction substitute worlds. Centre for Contemporary Art Łaźnia, Gdańsk (2013)
Sense of Place – European Landscape Photography, BOZAR, Brussels (2012)
Installation Camera Obscura (with Katarzyna Korzeniecka), Sculpture Museum Królikarnia, Warsaw;
Broken Movie – BWA Wrocław (2009)
Take a Look at me now - contemporary work from Poland
Sainbury Centre for Visual Arts, England;
Uncomfortable Images, 6 th Biennal of Photography, Poznań
Urbanity – Twenty Years Later, Praha/Berlin/Bratislava/Budapest/Ljubljana/Warszawa/Wien (2008) 
Red eye effect, Centre for Contemporary Art Ujazdowski Castle, Warsaw, Poland (2006)
The New Documentalists, Centre for Contemporary Art Ujazdowski Castle,  Warsaw, Poland; National Gallery in Bratislava, Slovakia
The End, My Friend, Spielhaus Morrisson Gallery, Berlin, Germany (2005)
Revenge on Realism – The fictitious moment in current Polish Art, Krinziger - Projekte Gallery, Vienna, Austria (2004)
Linger, Arsenal Gallery, Poznań, Poland

Selected individual exhibitions
Blackness, Gallery Aleksander Bruno, Warsaw, Poland (2014)
Project UFO, Photoespana / Blanca Soto Gallery, Madrid, Spain (2012)
Wir in Dresden, AF Gallery, Warsaw, Poland (2012)
KRA, Gallery PF, Poznań, Poland (2012)
Project UFO, Appendix 2, Warsaw, Poland (2009)
Project UFO, Artist House, Jerusalem, Israel (2008)
Project UFO, 20th Photo Biennale, Thessaloniki, Greece (2008)
Project UFO, Biala Gallery, Lublin, Poland (2007)

Publications
Szymon Roginski, Postcards from Otwock (2013, Nowy Teatr)
Adam Mazur, Decydujący Moment (Karakter, 2013)
Sense of Place – European Landscape Photography (Prestel, 2012)
High Touch – tactile design and visual explorations (Gestalten, 2012)
Zeitgenossiche Kunstler aus Polen, Positionen Series (Steidl, 2011)
Papercraft 2, (Gestalten, 2011)
Zdążyć przed zachodem słońca (Raster Gallery, 2004)

References

External links
Official website
Culture.pl bio

1975 births
Artists from Gdańsk
Polish photographers
Living people